Clint Hurtt (born November 7, 1978) is an American football coach who is the defensive coordinator for the Seattle Seahawks of the National Football League (NFL). He has previously served as an assistant coach for the Chicago Bears.

Career
On February 4, 2022, it was announced that the Seahawks would promote Hurtt to the position of defensive coordinator for the 2022 season.

References

1978 births
Living people
American football defensive tackles
Miami Hurricanes football players
Miami Hurricanes football coaches
FIU Panthers football coaches
Louisville Cardinals football coaches
Chicago Bears coaches
Seattle Seahawks coaches
National Football League defensive coordinators